Saud Al-Basher is a Saudi Arabian karateka. He won the silver medal in the men's 55kg event at the 2018 Asian Karate Championships held in Amman, Jordan. He won one of the bronze medals in the men's 60kg event at the 2021 Islamic Solidarity Games held in Konya, Turkey.

Achievements

References

External links 
 

Living people
Year of birth missing (living people)
Place of birth missing (living people)
Saudi Arabian male karateka
Islamic Solidarity Games medalists in karate
Islamic Solidarity Games competitors for Saudi Arabia
21st-century Saudi Arabian people